Rostanga bifurcata is a species of sea slug, a dorid nudibranch, a marine gastropod mollusc in the family Discodorididae.

Distribution
This species was described from Botany Bay, Sydney, Australia. It has subsequently been reported from western Australia, Singapore, Hong Kong, and Tasmania.

Description
This dorid nudibranch is red, and the dorsum is covered with caryophyllidia; it is very similar to other species of Rostanga.

Ecology
This nudibranch is found on a colony of the red sponge, Antho chartacea (family Microcionidae) on which it presumably feeds. Most other species of Rostanga'' also feed on sponges of the family Microcionidae.

References

Discodorididae
Gastropods described in 1989